Charles Damon Newton (May 25, 1861 Birdsall, Allegany County, New York – October 30, 1930 Geneseo, Livingston County, New York) was an American lawyer and politician.

Life
He was the son of Daniel Newton and Polly A. Brundage Newton. On August 10, 1887, he married Nellie E. Durfee.

He was a member of the New York State Senate (43rd D.) from 1915 to 1918, sitting in the 138th, 139th, 140th and 141st New York State Legislatures.

He was New York Attorney General from 1919 to 1922, elected on the Republican ticket at the New York state election, 1918, and re-elected at the New York state election, 1920.

Sources
 Political Graveyard

1861 births
1930 deaths
People from Allegany County, New York
New York State Attorneys General
Republican Party New York (state) state senators